Ying Fang (Chinese: 方颖; pinyin: Fāng Yǐng) is a Chinese operatic soprano. A principal soprano at the Metropolitan Opera in Manhattan, she won the Golden Bell Award at the Guangdong Singing Competition in China in 2009, first prize at the Gerda Lissner International Vocal Competition in 2013, and the Lincoln Center Segal Award in 2015. Her performances have been featured on the television program Great Performances at the Met and in movie theaters for the Metropolitan Opera Live in HD. In 2015 Opera News stated that "Ying Fang sings with exquisite simplicity and directness. The twenty-eight-year-old soprano never forces her sound or indulges in coloratura 'flash.' She is incapable of vulgarity; her dignity is unshakeable, and her powers of persuasion are sovereign."

Life and career
Born in Ningbo, China, Ying earned a bachelor of music degree from the Shanghai Conservatory of Music where she was a pupil of Jingzu Bian. She went on to earn a master's degree and an artist diploma from the Juilliard School in New York City under the tutelage of Edith Bers before becoming a member of The Metropolitan Opera’s Lindemann Young Artist Development Program. She performed in several operas at the Juilliard Opera Center, including portraying the roles of Fanny in Rossini's La cambiale di matrimonio (2012), The Spirit of the Boy in Britten’s Curlew River (2012), Zerlina in Mozart's Don Giovanni (2012), Susanna in Mozart's The Marriage of Figaro (2015), and the title role in Gluck's Iphigénie en Aulide (2015, with conductor Jane Glover).

In the 2021-2022 season, Ms. Fang makes her house debut at Opéra national de Paris as Susanna in Le nozze de Figaro, conducted by Gustavo Dudamel, and subsequently reprises the role both in a return to the Metropolitan Opera and in her debut at the Matsumoto Festival in Japan. She also 
returns to Lyric Opera of Chicago as Pamina in Die Zauberflöte, and returns to Dutch National Opera for her role debut as Ännchen in Der Freischütz. On the concert stage, she joins the Metropolitan Opera Orchestra and Chorus under the direction of Yannick Nézet-Séguin for a special season-opening performance of Mahler’s Symphony No. 2 Resurrection. Additionally, she goes on tour with Ensemble Pygmalion under the direction of Raphaël Pichon, makes her debut at the Tanglewood Festival in Brahms’ Ein deutsches Requiem with the Boston Symphony Orchestra led by Andris Nelsons, and returns to the Verbier Festival both as the soprano soloist in Mozart’s Requiem led by Andras Schiff and in her role debut as Oscar in Un ballo in Maschera led by Gianandrea Noseda. 

In the 2020-2021 season, Ms. Fang made her house debut at both Dutch National Opera and Santa Fe Opera as Susanna in Le nozze di Figaro, a role she had also been scheduled to reprise at Lyric Opera of Chicago. In concert, she joined Dutch National Opera in a performance of Rossini’s Petite messe solennelle. Previously scheduled concert engagements included Haydn’s Creation with Music of the Baroque under the baton of Dame Jane Glover, as well as both Mahler’s Symphony No. 2 Resurrection and Symphony No. 8 at the Mahler Festival in Leipzig, under the baton of Andris Nelsons.

During the 2019-2020 season, Ms. Fang made her house debut at Lyric Opera of Chicago as Zerlina in Don Giovanni, led by James Gaffigan, and returned to the Metropolitan Opera as Pamina in The Magic Flute in Julie Taymor’s magical production, conducted by Lothar Koenigs.  Previously scheduled operatic engagements included her role debut as Sophie in Werther, also at the Metropolitan Opera, as well as house debuts at Houston Grand Opera as Pamina and Los Angeles Opera as Susanna. In concert, Ms. Fang sang Mahler’s Symphony No. 2, led by Gianandrea Noseda, at the Tsinandali Festival in Georgia, and gave solo recitals with pianist Ken Noda at the Philadelphia Chamber Music Society and Celebrity Series of Boston. She had also been scheduled to return to the Verbier Festival, where she would have performed a concert version of Don Giovanni under Gábor Takács-Nagy as well as Mozart’s Requiem conducted by Sir András Schiff.

In the 2018-2019 season, Mozart was the foundation for two auspicious debuts for Ms. Fang. Her debut at the Salzburger Festspiele, where she sang Ilia in a new production of Idomeneo, reunited her with director Peter Sellars. She also returned to the Metropolitan Opera for her role debut as Servilia in Jean-Pierre Ponnelle’s renowned production of La Clemenza di Tito. On the concert stage, she rejoined the Los Angeles Philharmonic, in collaboration with conductor Susanna Mälkki
and The Old Globe Theatre of San Diego, for performances as Juno in Sibelius’ incidental music to Shakespeare's The Tempest, and returned to the New York Philharmonic for performances of Brahms’ Ein deutsches Requiem under Jaap van Zweden. She also made debuts with several orchestras, including the Cleveland Orchestra as Echo in Ariadne auf Naxos, under the baton of Franz Welser-Möst; the Boston Symphony Orchestra under Andris Nelsons and Hong Kong Philharmonic under Jaap van Zweden for Mahler’s Symphony No. 2; both the San Francisco Symphony and Houston Symphony for Handel’s Messiah under Jane Glover; the Malaysian Philharmonic under Roberto Abbado and North Carolina Symphony under Carlos Miguel Prieto for Orff’s Carmina Burana; and a Carnegie Hall concert with Orchestra of St. Luke’s under Bernard Labadie for Mozart’s concert aria "Venga la morte....Non temer, amato bene.”

Ms. Fang’s previous seasons have included performances with conductors James Levine, Sir Andrew Davis, Carlo Rizzi, Alan Gilbert, William Christie, Emmanuelle Haïm, Jesús López Cobos, Bernard Labadie, Nathalie Stutzmann, and Manfred Honeck. She has sung at Opernhaus Zürich, Opéra de Lille, Vancouver Opera, Opera Philadelphia, Washington National Opera, Wolf Trap Opera Company, Aspen Opera Theater Center, and The Juilliard School in such varied operas as L’Italiana in Algeri (Elvira), Jenůfa (Jano), Die Zauberflöte (Pamina), Le nozze di Figaro (Susanna), L’elisir d’amore (Adina), Alcina (Morgana), Il Trionfo del Tempo e del Disinganno (Bellezza), Tannhäuser (Shepherd), Hänsel und Gretel (Dew Fairy), Falstaff (Nannetta), Giulio Cesare (Cleopatra), Il Viaggio A Reims (Contessa di Folleville), Zaïde (title role), The Nose (Madame Podtochina’s Daughter), Don Giovanni (Zerlina), La Cambiale di Matrimonio (Fanny), Die Entführung aus dem Serail (Konstanze), and Curlew River (Spirit of the Boy). Concert engagements have included appearances with the New York Philharmonic, Philadelphia Orchestra, Pittsburgh Symphony, New World Symphony, National Symphony Orchestra, St. Luke’s Chamber Ensemble, and Music of the Baroque Orchestra in Mahler’s Symphony Nos. 2 and 4, Handel’s Messiah, Telemann’s Der Tag des Gerichts, Handel’s Silete Venti, Bernstein’s West Side Story, and more. Ms. Fang has given performances at Carnegie Hall, the Kennedy Center, and Alice Tully Hall, as well as with the Verbier Festival, Festival d’Aix-en-Provence, and Ravinia Festival.

Ms. Fang is the recipient of the Martin E. Segal Award, the Hildegard Behrens Foundation Award, the Rose Bampton Award of The Sullivan Foundation, The Opera Index Award, and First Prize of the Gerda Lissner International Vocal Competition. In 2009, she become one of the youngest singers to win one of China’s most prestigious awards – the China Golden Bell Award for Music. She has been hailed as “the most gifted Chinese soprano of her generation” by Ningbo Daily.

See also
 Chinese people in New York City
 Opera in China

References

External links

Living people
Chinese operatic sopranos
Juilliard School alumni
Musicians from Ningbo
Shanghai Conservatory of Music alumni
Year of birth missing (living people)
21st-century Chinese women opera singers